Orlean is a rural locality (a selo) and the administrative center of Orleansky Selsoviet, Blagoveshchensky District, Altai Krai, Russia. The population was 525 as of 2013. There are 4 streets.

Geography 
Orlean is located 30 km southwest of Blagoveshchenka (the district's administrative centre) by road. Yagotino is the nearest rural locality.

References 

Rural localities in Blagoveshchensky District, Altai Krai